The Little Sisters of the Poor Home for the Aged is a historic building in Nashville, Tennessee, U.S.. It was built in 1916 for the Little Sisters of the Poor, a Roman Catholic order which takes care of the elderly poor. It closed down in 1968, and it was turned into a series of nursing homes until 1998. It was subsequently used by the music industry, including Sony. In 2014, Sony Music sold it to Vanderbilt University for US$12.1 million.

The building has been listed on the National Register of Historic Places since July 25, 1985.

References

1916 establishments in Tennessee
Buildings and structures completed in 1916
Buildings and structures in Nashville, Tennessee
Buildings and structures on the National Register of Historic Places in Tennessee
Renaissance Revival architecture in Tennessee
Sony
Vanderbilt University